The National University of General San Martín (UNSAM) is an Argentine public university whose main campus is located in the city of San Martín, Buenos Aires Province.

The university was established in 1992, when the executive approved law number 2409 passed by Congress after years of bills presented and demands for creation dating back to 1990. The university launched officially its regular teaching activities in 1994.

History 
The creation of The National University of General San Martin was enabled by two trends: the first, following a tendency initiated in the 1970s, decentralization of the largest universities in Argentina; and the second, following the desire of the local community of San Martin to establish a university in its own territory. This tension forged the initial identity of the institution, promoting the capacities and meeting the local demands, and responding to the vacant areas in the Argentinian university system. The first academic activities of undergraduate and postgraduate students began in 1994.

The university has as its aim and standard the following concepts and ideals: academic liberty and respect for the diversity of thought; team spirit for the continual improvement of the institution; social responsibility and service vocation; efficiency and transparency in management; and respect for other's work and respect for the work environment.

Campus 
The main grounds of the university are located at Campus Miguelete, a 8.5-hectare compound named after Miguelete railway station. A surface of 48,000 square meters is occupied by buildings as of 2013. The campus was built on the site of a former rail yard. 

Additional courses are imparted at the INTI and CNEA headquarters, in Buenos Aires. The Instituto Sabato is a branch of this university.

Gallery

References

External links

NU of SAM – official website

San Martin
Educational institutions established in 1994
Universities in Buenos Aires Province
1994 establishments in Argentina